Guillermo Olaso de la Rica (born 25 March 1988) is a Spanish professional tennis player.

Challenger finals

Singles: 1 (0-1)

Doubles: 5 (2-3)

Futures

Notes

References

External links
 
 

Sportspeople from Bilbao
Spanish male tennis players
Tennis players from Barcelona
1988 births
Living people
Tennis players from the Basque Country (autonomous community)